Edmund Morris may refer to:

Edmund Morris (MP for Leominster) (fl. 1410)
Edmund Morris (writer) (1940–2019), biographer of US presidents Reagan and Theodore Roosevelt
Edmund Morris (MP for Leicestershire) (c. 1686–1759), English politician
Edmund L. Morris (1923–2003), Canadian Member of Parliament for Halifax riding
Edmund Finucane Morris (1792–1871), British Army officer
Edmund Montague Morris (1871–1913), Canadian painter